Buckau is a river of Brandenburg, Germany. It flows into the Breitlingsee, which is drained by the Havel, near Brandenburg an der Havel.

See also
List of rivers of Brandenburg

Rivers of Brandenburg
Rivers of Germany